Christian Humberto Martínez Palomera (born October 22, 1990) is a professional Mexican footballer who currently plays for Murciélagos F.C.

References

1990 births
Living people
Place of birth missing (living people)
Mexican footballers
Association footballers not categorized by position
21st-century Mexican people